Damiano Lassandro (born 18 December 1947) is an Italian boxer. He competed in the men's welterweight event at the 1972 Summer Olympics.

References

External links
 

1947 births
Living people
Italian male boxers
Olympic boxers of Italy
Boxers at the 1972 Summer Olympics
Sportspeople from Bari
Mediterranean Games bronze medalists for Italy
Mediterranean Games medalists in boxing
Competitors at the 1971 Mediterranean Games
Welterweight boxers
20th-century Italian people
21st-century Italian people